Gregory Phillip Kane ( – February 18, 2014) was an American journalist and political and social commentator.

Background
Kane was born in Baltimore and grew up in West Baltimore.  He attended Baltimore City Public Schools and graduated from the Baltimore City College high school in 1969.

Career
Kane began his journalism career in 1984 as a freelance writer for The Baltimore Sun, and became a staff writer for the newspaper from 1993 to 2008. In 2008, The Baltimore Examiner hired him as a columnist. After The Baltimore Examiner closed in 2009, he began writing for its sister newspaper, The Washington Examiner, where he wrote until his death. Kane was also a visiting professor at the Writing Seminars at Johns Hopkins University.  Kane died on February 18, 2014, after a battle with cancer.

Awards
In 1997, Kane was nominated along with Baltimore Sun reporter Gilbert Lewthwaite for the Pulitzer Prize in Explanatory Journalism for a three-part series about slavery in Sudan. Both men won the Overseas Press Club award for best reporting on human rights and an award from the National Association of Black Journalists for the series.

Kane has also won several awards from Baltimore magazine, the Press Club of Atlantic City, and the Maryland chapter of the Society of Professional Journalists.

A moving letter-tribute to Kane appeared in the February 22, 2014, Baltimore Sun.

References

Year of birth missing
2014 deaths
American political writers
American male non-fiction writers
African-American journalists
1950s births
Writers from Baltimore
Journalists from Maryland
The Baltimore Sun people
Baltimore City College alumni
Franklin & Marshall College alumni
Towson University alumni
American University alumni
Johns Hopkins University faculty
Deaths from cancer in Maryland
20th-century African-American people
21st-century African-American people